Pablo Semprún (born August 5, 1964 in Madrid, Spain) is a former Spanish tennis and padel tennis player. He founded the Pablo Semprún Sport Center, a padel tennis academy and sport center.

Paddle tennis achievements

 5 times Spain's champion.
 (Doubles) Sub-world champion .... 1996. Madrid, Spain.
 (Doubles) World champion team .... 1998. Mar Del Plata, Argentina.
 (Doubles) European championship .... 1995. Ravenna, Italy.
 The International champion of Spain .... 1998.
 The International champion of France .... 1999.
 Bronze medal for Sports Merit.... 2003.

References

Padel Tennis World Championship. Pablo Semprún (paddle tennis) 
"Pablo Semprún, estrella del padel español". (paddle tennis)
Leach and Tabares lead U.S. to victory over Spain at ITF Seniors. (tennis) In the opening singles match, Curtis Dunn of San Francisco fell to Spain’s Pablo Semprun, 6-3, 6-4, which gave Spain an early 1-0 lead.
Spanish national champions headline Medis Copa Iberica. (tennis) Winners
Potter Cup Committee prepares for 2011 edition The Spanish team includes the following players; Jordi Arrese, David de Miguel, Marcos Gorriz, Miquel Puigdevall, Carlos Costa, Pablo Semprún, Francisco Garcia, Eduardo Osta, Fernando Luna and Francesc Castellá
Itaroa Pablo Semprún S.C.

1964 births
Living people
Tennis players from Madrid
Spanish male tennis players
Semprún family
People from Madrid
Padel players